The European Union (EU) has undertaken a number of overseas missions and operations, drawing on civilian and military capabilities, in several countries across three continents (Europe, Africa and Asia), as part of its Common Security and Defence Policy (CSDP). The operation or mission in question will work in agreement and coordination with the EU delegations, until 2009 known as the European Security and Defence Policy (ESDP).

Organisation

Deployment procedure

The decision to deploy - together with any subsequent management of - the mission or operation in question, will ultimately be taken by the EU member states in the Foreign Affairs Council (FAC).

Military operations may be launched after four planning phases, through which the Operation Commander (Op. Cdr.), Military Staff (EUMS), Military Committee (EUMC), Political and Security Committee (PSC) and Council have different roles.

Command and control structure

Classification

In the EU terminology, civilian CSDP interventions are called ‘missions’, regardless of whether they have an executive mandate such as EULEX Kosovo  or a non-executive mandate (all others). Military interventions, however, can either have an executive mandate such as for example Operation Atalanta in which case they are referred to as ‘operations’ and are commanded at two-star level; or non-executive mandate (e.g. EUTM Somalia) in which case they are called ‘missions’ and are commanded at one-star level.

Prefixes

All CSDP missions and operations are given a prefix depending on the nature of the mission, which is either military or civilian.

Civilian missions:

Military advisory mission (EUMAM)
Aviation security mission (EUAVSEC)
Rule of law mission (EULEX)
Mission in support of the security sector reform (EUSSR)
Integrated rule of law mission (EUJUST)
Mission to provide advice and assistance for security sector reform (EUSEC)
Monitoring mission (EUMM)
Advisory mission (EUAM)

Police advisory team (EUPAT)

Military operations:

 
The operations are named as if the multinational force conducting it is established specifically for the unique operation, which is often the case. The force may however also consist of permanent multinational forces such as the European Corps.

List

Proposed missions

Current proposals
 20 February 2023: At a meeting of the EU Foreign Affairs Council, Moldovan foreign minister Nicu Popescu expressed an interest in the deployment of a Common Security and Defence Policy mission in Moldova. The Council of the European Union is to explore this possibility.

Historical proposals
 1 April 2011: European Union Military Operation in Libya (EUFOR Libya) - Proposed as a complement to NATO's international military intervention and no-fly zone in the Libyan Civil War.

See also

Related topics of the Common Security and Defence Policy:
 Operations of the European Border and Coast Guard
 Defence forces of the European Union
 History of the Common Security and Defence Policy

Operations and exercises of the precursors of the Common Security and Defence Policy
 Missions of the Western European Union
 Exercises of the Western Union

Operations and exercises of the multinational forces made available to the CSDP in accordance with article 42.3 of the Treaty on European Union:
 List of operations of the European Maritime Force
 List of operations of the European Rapid Operational Force
 List of missions of the European Gendarmerie Force
 List of exercises of the European Maritime Force
 List of operations of the European Corps

Missions and exercises of other organisations:
 List of missions of the United Nations
 List of operations of the North Atlantic Treaty Organisation
 List of exercises of the North Atlantic Treaty Organisation

Notes

References

External links

 List of CSDP missions
EU Civilian and Military Missions 2003-14, London School of Economics
 PhD Thesis on Civilian CSDP - EU Civilian crisis management (University of Geneva, 2008, 441 p. in French)
 Benjamin Pohl (2013) The logic underpinning EU crisis management operations, European Security, 22(3): 307–325, DOI:10.1080/09662839.2012.726220.

 
European Union
Missions
European Union